The Mayotte women's national football team represents the French overseas department and region of Mayotte in international football.

Mayotte is a member of neither FIFA nor CAF, so it is not eligible to enter the World Cup or the African Cup of Nations.

Mayotte Football Achievements

Indian Ocean Island Games

Fixtures and results

Head-to-Head Records against other countries

Honours
This is a list of honours for the senior Mayotte national team

Indian Ocean Island Games
 Bronze Medal  : 2015

External links
Official website 

W
Football in Mayotte
African national association football teams
National football teams of Overseas France